Karie Murphy is a British trade unionist and political strategist who served as the Executive Director of the Leader of the Opposition's Office under Jeremy Corbyn from 2016 to 2020.

Early career
Murphy was a nurse for 25 years before entering trade union politics. She worked with HIV positive patients at Ruchill Hospital in Glasgow.

Political career
Murphy has a long career in the Labour movement, including several years on the staff of Tom Watson.

She has sought nomination as a Labour Party parliamentary candidate several times. In 2013, the selection process for Falkirk led to a party inquiry into accusations of vote-rigging. Murphy, whose candidature had been promoted by Len McCluskey, was cleared of any wrongdoing but withdrew from the contest.

From 2016, Murphy was executive director of the Leader's Office, under Jeremy Corbyn. Along with Seumas Milne, Andrew Murray and McCluskey, she has been identified as one of the "Four Ms" whom it is claimed had significant influence on Corbyn's leadership of the Labour Party.

In the 2017 general election, it was the Labour leadership's office team, led by Murphy, that was credited with the foresight to approach the poll in ways barely understood by most media commentators at the time, resulting in a hung parliament. Among the team, Murphy was reported as having come closest to predicting the result.

In October 2019, Murphy was seconded to Labour head office to lead the forthcoming general election campaign, which resulted in Labour's worst performance since 1935.

Following the 2019 general election, which saw Labour achieve its fewest seats since the 1935 election, some attributed the defeat to Murphy's strategic approach. She had reportedly told advisors that the election was to be "a full-on assault" and that "every single seat is there for the battle." The Sunday Times leaked a list of target seats on 19 January which included Stourbridge (Con majority 7,654), Dover (6,437) and Gloucester (5,520). Sources in The Times criticised the failure to provide resources to internal Corbyn critics such as Ruth Smeeth, Mary Creagh, and Melanie Onn, as well as the decision to target seats such as Finchley and Golders Green where former Labour MP Luciana Berger was running, and Plaid Cymru-held Arfon instead of Conservative-Labour marginals in nearby Aberconwy and Clwyd West. The Times claimed it had spoken to some senior figures in the Labour Party who felt Murphy approached the contest with a "deranged optimism" after the 2017 election, while others felt that she and McCluskey had been driven by a desire to "prove wrong" pro-EU MPs such as Keir Starmer and Emily Thornberry.

Despite the result of the election, Murphy was named by Corbyn in his dissolution honours list. The Guardian reported "some [Labour Party] members were infuriated by the news". Labour Deputy Leader candidate Rosena Allin-Khan stated that "anyone being investigated by the EHRC (should not) be recommended for a peerage". In June 2020, it was reported that Murphy's peerage had been blocked by the House of Lords Appointments Commission and subsequently her name did not appear on the list of confirmed peerages in August 2020.

In October 2021 the Labour Party named Murphy as being one of the persons responsible for the deliberate leaking of thousands of items of personal data. Labour also revealed they are taking legal action against Murphy over the same issue. The leaking of the data is likely to cost Labour millions of pounds in fines and payments.

Personal life 
In 2017, Murphy revealed she had donated a kidney to save the life of a boy she did not know.

In 2021, McCluskey wrote in his autobiography that he used funds from the Unite trade union, of which he was then leader, to pay libel lawyers to prevent the press from publishing that he and Murphy were in a romantic relationship even though they were.

References

Labour Party (UK) officials
Year of birth missing (living people)
Living people